Gauriganj railway station is a railway station in Amethi district, Uttar Pradesh. Its code is GNG. It serves Amethi District headquarter Gauriganj town. The station consists of two platforms, newly constructed station and being electrified the rail line. The platforms are partially sheltered and has facilities including wifi, chair seating, drinking water, parking, and toilet.

Trains
Some of the trains that runs from Gauriganj are :
 Howrah–Amritsar Express
 Neelachal Express
 Padmavat Express
 Varanasi–Dehradun Express
 Marudhar Express (via Pratapgarh)
 Malda Town–New Delhi Express
 Jaunpur–Rae Bareli Express
 Prayag–Bareilly Express
 Varanasi–Lucknow Intercity Express

See also
 Amethi railway station
 Rae Bareli Junction railway station
 Pratapgarh Junction railway station

References

External links 
 GNG/GauriGanj

Railway stations in Amethi district
Lucknow NR railway division